A list of notable people from the county of Gloucestershire:

See also
List of freemen of the City of Gloucester
:Category:People from Gloucestershire

References

 
Gloucestershire
People
Gloucester